Escolta Street (lit: Escort) is a historic east–west street located in the old downtown district of Binondo in Manila, Philippines. It runs parallel to the Pasig River, from Plaza Santa Cruz to Plaza Moraga and Quintin Paredes Street. The street is home to several fine examples of early skyscraper design in the Philippines. In Spanish, it is known as calle de la Escolta. Its definition as a historic financial district includes Escolta and other surrounding streets of Binondo and Santa Cruz. It currently carries one-way eastbound traffic towards Santa Cruz.

History

One of the oldest streets in Manila, Escolta was created in 1594. Its name was derived from the Spanish word escoltar, meaning "to escort".

In Walter Robb's essay Main Street, he states, "The gates of the walled city were closed at sunset, when curfew rang from the towers of all its churches; they were not opened again until dawn. Low, massive, stone-arched, typically medieval as you see them today, these gates were all furnished out with ponderous drawbridges lowered and raised by rude capstans, with strong porcullises of square iron bars which settled into place as the drawbridges rose upright."  After some individuals went missing "along the sandy path to the bridge," Robb continues, a delegation petitioned the governor to station a detachment of halberdiers "along the path as a guard until after the city gates were closed."  "The governor assented, detailing a grizzled officer to arrange the escort, the escolta, in such a manner as to protect the path for a period of six months; and from this the winding path by the riverside got its name, la escolta, the escort, long before it was widened to the dignity of a street."

Escolta was known for its concentration of immigrant merchants, mainly from Fujian, China, who came to make their fortune during the Manila-Acapulco Galleon trade. The street was lined with shops and boutiques selling imported goods from China, Europe and elsewhere in Latin America that arrived in the nearby port of San Nicolas. By the late 19th century, Escolta flourished into a fashionable business district hosting the city's tallest buildings as well as the Manila Stock Exchange. The shops were replaced by modern department stores and an electric tram line known as tranvía plied the street. Escolta served as the city's primary commercial district until its decline in the 1960s when the center of business gradually shifted to Makati.

In music 
The first known reference to "La Escolta", can be heard on the zarzuela "El pay-pay de Manila"
Al volver de la Escolta Charito
tras comprarse un precioso paipay,
y una carta encontró de Pepito
en su rocabay,
¡Ay, que se le cai!
Y en la carta le hablaba de amor
¡Ay Jesús, qué calor, qué calor!

Architectural establishments

 Don Roman Santos Building
A neo-classical building fronting Plaza Goiti (Lacson) in the eastern end of Escolta Street. The building once housed the headquarters of Monte de Piedad and Prudential Bank before it was sold to Bank of the Philippine Islands.

 First United Building
One of the few surviving examples of art deco architecture in Manila, it was the tallest building in Manila at the time of its completion in 1928. Designed by Andres Luna de San Pedro, the building was previously named Perez Samanillo Building.

El Hogar Filipino Building
 A neo-classical and Renaissance building built as a wedding gift for the union of a Zobel daughter and a Peruvian count back in 1914. It was designed by Ramon Irureta-Goyena and Francisco Perez-Muñoz in the Beaux Arts Style.

 Regina Building
Built in 1934, this four-storey building was designed in the neo-classical style by Andres Luna de San Pedro.

 Natividad Building
A beaux arts style building that housed the Insurance Commission in the 1950s.

 Burke Building
Named after philanthropist, William J. Burke, the building is known as the location of the first elevator in Manila.

 Calvo Building
Another fine example of beaux arts style architecture, it was built in 1938 by Edificio Calvo and designed by Fernando Ocampo. In 1950, the building was also the location of the first radio studio of DZBB-AM (a flagship AM radio station of GMA Network) until 1957 before the transferring of the DZBB studio in GMA Network Center (the current headquarters of GMA 7) along EDSA corner Timog Avenue, Diliman, Quezon City.

 Capitol Theater
Designed by Juan Nakpil and built in the 1930s, this theater had a double balcony, which is a rare architectural design. The theater's facade has reliefs of two muses done by Francesco Monti. The theater is now closed, its location serving as a venue for a few commercial establishments and restaurants.

Gallery

See also 
 Colon Street
 Calle Real

References

Streets in Manila
Binondo